First Presbyterian Church of Ontario Center is a historic Presbyterian church located at Ontario Center in Wayne County, New York.  It was built in 1914 and is a Tudor Revival style concrete block church cast to resemble rusticated masonry. It is roughly square in plan and topped by a cross gable roof. The front facade features a massive square corner tower capped with a crenelated parapet.

It was listed on the National Register of Historic Places in 1998.

References

Churches on the National Register of Historic Places in New York (state)
Presbyterian churches in New York (state)
Churches completed in 1914
20th-century Presbyterian churches
Churches in Wayne County, New York
National Register of Historic Places in Wayne County, New York